Altamont is an unincorporated community in Avery County, North Carolina, United States. The community is located along US 221/NC 194 (Linville Falls Highway), between the town of Crossnore and the community of Linville Falls. Altamont translates to "High Mountain."

The Ray Wiseman House was listed on the National Register of Historic Places in 1996.

See also
 Linville River

References

Unincorporated communities in Avery County, North Carolina
Unincorporated communities in North Carolina